The 1967 South American Championships in Athletics  were held in Buenos Aires, Argentina, between 7 and 15 October.

Medal summary

Men's events

Women's events

Medal table

External links
 Men Results – GBR Athletics
 Women Results – GBR Athletics
 Medallists

S
South American Championships in Athletics
 Sports competitions in Buenos Aires
1967 in South American sport
International athletics competitions hosted by Argentina
1967 in Argentine sport
October 1967 sports events in South America